Hemolymph, or haemolymph, is a fluid, analogous to the blood in vertebrates, that circulates in the interior of the arthropod (invertebrate) body, remaining in direct contact with the animal's tissues. It is composed of a fluid plasma in which hemolymph cells called hemocytes are suspended. In addition to hemocytes, the plasma also contains many chemicals. It is the major tissue type of the open circulatory system characteristic of arthropods (for example, arachnids, crustaceans and insects). In addition, some non-arthropods such as mollusks possess a hemolymphatic circulatory system.

Oxygen-transport systems were long thought unnecessary in insects, but ancestral and functional hemocyanin has been found in the hemolymph. Insect "blood" generally does not carry hemoglobin, although hemoglobin may be present in the tracheal system instead and play some role in respiration.

Method of transport 

In the grasshopper, the closed portion of the system consists of tubular hearts and an aorta running along the dorsal side of the insect. The hearts pump hemolymph into the sinuses of the hemocoel where exchanges of materials take place. The volume of hemolymph needed for such a system is kept to a minimum by a reduction in the size of the body cavity. The hemocoel is divided into chambers called sinuses.

Coordinated movements of the body muscles gradually bring the hemolymph back to the dorsal sinus surrounding the hearts. Between contractions, tiny valves in the wall of the hearts open and allow hemolymph to enter. Hemolymph fills all of the interior (the hemocoel) of the animal's body and surrounds all cells. It contains hemocyanin, a copper-based protein that turns blue when oxygenated, instead of the iron-based hemoglobin in red blood cells found in vertebrates, giving hemolymph a blue-green color rather than the red color of vertebrate blood. When not oxygenated, hemolymph quickly loses its color and appears grey.

The hemolymph of lower arthropods, including most insects, is not used for oxygen transport because these animals respirate through other means, such as tracheas, but it does contain nutrients such as proteins and sugars. Muscular movements by the animal during locomotion can facilitate hemolymph movement, but diverting flow from one area to another is limited. When the heart relaxes, hemolymph is drawn back toward the heart through open-ended pores called ostia. Note that the term "ostia" is not specific to insect circulation; it literally means "doors" or "openings", and must be understood in context.

Constituents 

Hemolymph can contain nucleating agents that confer extra cellular freezing protection.  Such nucleating agents have been found in the hemolymph of insects of several orders, i.e., Coleoptera (beetles), Diptera (flies), and Hymenoptera.

Inorganic 

Hemolymph is composed of water, inorganic salts (mostly sodium, chlorine, potassium, magnesium, and calcium), and organic compounds (mostly carbohydrates, proteins, and lipids). The primary oxygen transporter molecule is hemocyanin.

Amino acids 

Arthropod hemolymph contains high levels of free amino acids. Most amino acids are present but their relative concentrations vary from species to species.  Concentrations of amino acids also vary according to the arthropod stage of development. An example of this is the silkworm and its need for glycine in the production of silk.

Proteins 

Proteins present in the hemolymph vary in quantity during the course of development. These proteins are classified by their functions: chroma proteins, protease inhibitors, storage, lipid transport, enzymes, the vitellogenins, and those involved in the immune responses of arthropods. Some hemolymphic proteins incorporate carbohydrates and lipids into the structure.

Other organic constituents 

Nitrogen metabolism end products are present in the hemolymph in low concentrations. These include ammonia, allantoin, uric acid, and urea. Arthropod hormones are present, most notably the juvenile hormone. Trehalose can be present and sometimes in great amounts along with glucose. These sugar levels are maintained by the control of hormones. Other carbohydrates can be present. These include inositol, sugar alcohol, hexosamines, mannitol, glycerol and those components that are precursors to chitin.

Free lipids are present and are used as fuel for flight.

Hemocytes 

There are free-floating cells, the hemocytes, within the hemolymph. They play a role in the arthropod immune system. The immune system resides in the hemolymph.

Comparisons to vertebrates 

This open system might appear to be inefficient compared to the closed circulatory systems of the vertebrates, but the two systems have very different demands placed on them. In vertebrates, the circulatory system is responsible for transporting oxygen to all the tissues and removing carbon dioxide from them. It is this requirement that establishes the level of performance demanded of the system. The efficiency of the vertebrate system is far greater than is needed for transporting nutrients, hormones, and so on, whereas in insects, exchange of oxygen and carbon dioxide occurs in the tracheal system. Hemolymph plays no part in the process in most insects. Only in a few insects living in low-oxygen environments are there hemoglobin-like molecules that bind oxygen and transport it to the tissues. Therefore, the demands placed upon the system are much lower. Some arthropods and most molluscs possess the copper-containing hemocyanin, however, for oxygen transport.

Specialist uses 

In some species, hemolymph has other uses than just being a blood analogue. As the insect or arachnid grows, the hemolymph works something like a hydraulic system, enabling the insect or arachnid to expand segments before they are sclerotized. It can also be used hydraulically as a means of assisting movement, such as in arachnid locomotion. Some species of insect or arachnid are able to autohaemorrhage when they are attacked by predators. Queens of the ant genus Leptanilla are fed with hemolymph produced by the larvae. On the other hand, Pemphigus spyrothecae utilize hemolymph as an adhesive, allowing the species to stick to predators and subsequently attack the predator; it was found that with larger predators, more aphids were stuck after the predator was defeated.

See also
 Insect physiology
 Respiratory system of insects

References

Sources

External links 
 
 

Blood
Arthropod anatomy
Insect anatomy
Crustacean anatomy
Arachnid anatomy
Body fluids